Solomon Kondowe (born 23 September 1960) is a Malawian boxer. He competed in the men's lightweight event at the 1984 Summer Olympics.

References

1960 births
Living people
Lightweight boxers
Light-welterweight boxers
Malawian male boxers
Olympic boxers of Malawi
Boxers at the 1984 Summer Olympics
Boxers at the 1986 Commonwealth Games
Commonwealth Games bronze medallists for Malawi
Commonwealth Games medallists in boxing
Place of birth missing (living people)
Medallists at the 1986 Commonwealth Games